The Chief of Chaplains of the United States Air Force (HAF/HC) is the senior chaplain in the United States Air Force, the functional leader of the U.S. Air Force Chaplain Corps, and the senior advisor on religious issues to the Secretary and Chief of Staff of the United States Air Force.

The position has been held by Major General Randall E. Kitchens since October 2021.

List of Chiefs of Chaplains of the United States Air Force

See also
Armed Forces Chaplains Board
 Deputy Chief of Chaplains of the United States Air Force
Chiefs of Chaplains of the United States
International Military Chiefs of Chaplains Conference

References

United States Air Force Chief
 

United States Air Force appointments